Maldon West railway station served the town of Maldon, Essex. It was opened on 1 October 1889 by the Great Eastern Railway on a branch line from Woodham Ferrers to Maldon. It was closed in 1916 during World War I but reopened as a halt in 1919.

The station was permanently closed to passenger services in September 1939 but the line remained in use for goods traffic until 1959.

References

External links
 Maldon West station on navigable 1945 O. S. map
 GER Society webpage containing photograph of the station in the 1920s
 Photograph of a 'last passenger service' steam special, 1957
 Railway history on local web site, with photos

Disused railway stations in Essex
Former Great Eastern Railway stations
Railway stations in Great Britain opened in 1889
Railway stations in Great Britain closed in 1916
Railway stations in Great Britain opened in 1919
Railway stations in Great Britain closed in 1939
Maldon, Essex